The following is a timeline of the history of the municipality of Liège, Belgium.

Prior to 18th century

 ca.558 - St Monulph, bishop of Tongres, built a chapel.
  721 - Catholic see relocated to Liège from Maastricht.
  965 - Church of St. Martin founded.
  980 - Prince-Bishopric of Liège established.
  987 - Church of St. Denis founded.
  1015
 Collegiate Church of St. Bartholomew consecrated.
  founded.
  1050 - St. Lambert's Cathedral dedicated.
  1124 -  construction begins.
  1232 - St. Paul's Cathedral construction begins.
  1255 - Citadel of Liège built.
  1316 -  signed, establishing a somewhat representative government in Liège.
  1325 - Guild unrest.
  1408 - 23 September: Battle of Othée.
  1468
 Liège sacked by forces of Charles the Bold of Burgundy.
 29 October: Six hundred Franchimontois fight Burgundian forces.
  1506 - Érard de La Marck becomes Prince-bishop of Liège.

  1526 - Prince-Bishops' Palace construction begins.
  1546 -  built.
  1561 -  (market) active.
  1594
 Foire de Liège (festival) begins.
  1614 - Béguinage Saint-Esprit founded.
  1616 -  built.
  1623 -  compound built.
  1637 - April: Murder of Sébastien de La Ruelle sparks anti-Spanish rioting.

18th–19th centuries
 1702 - Liége taken by The duke of Marlborough  
 1747 - Banque Nagelmackers founded.
 1772 -  built.
 1775 - Académie royale des beaux-arts de Liège established.
 1779 - Société littéraire de Liège and  founded.
 1789 - August: Liège Revolution begins; Republic of Liège established.
 1794 - St. Lambert's Cathedral sacked.
 1795 - "Union with France decreed."
 1796
 Liège becomes part of France.
  established.
 1812 - Mine accident, 74 men trapped in a flooded mine.
 1815 - Liège becomes part of the Netherlands, viz. the Congress of Vienna.
 1817
 University of Liège founded.
 Cockerill manufactory in business in nearby Seraing.
 1820 - Royal Theatre opens.
 1826 - Royal Conservatory of Liège founded.
 1830 - Liège becomes part of Belgium.
 1835
 Ateliers de construction de La Meuse in business.
 Banque Liégeoise established.
 1840 -  newspaper begins publication.
 1842 - Liège-Guillemins railway station opens.
 1848 -  laid out.
 1850 -  founded.
 1853 -  established.
 1856 -  (literary society) established.
 1862 - Bibliothèque populaire communale du Centre (library) opens.
 1863 - Population: 108,710.
 1868 - Equestrian statue of Charlemagne unveiled.
 1870 - Etablissements François was established.
 1871 - Horse-drawn tram begins operating.
 1875 - Population: 117,600.
 1877 - Hasselt-Liège railway in operation.
 1880
  created.
 1888 - Construction of area fortifications begins.
 1889 - La Revue Blanche literary magazine begins publication.
 1892 - Liège–Bastogne–Liège cycling race begins.
 1893 - Electric tram begins operating.
 1898 - Standard Liège football club formed.
 1900 - Population: 157,760.

20th century

 1904 -  (bridge) built.
 1905
 April: Liège International (1905) world's fair opens.
 Population: 168,532.
 1909 - Stade Maurice Dufrasne (stadium) opens.
 1911
 Banque Centrale de Liège established.
  cinema opens.
 1914 - August: Battle of Liège.
 1919
 Simenon's novel Au Pont des Arches published.
 Population: 166,697.
 1922 -  theatre opens.
 1928 -  erected.
 1930
 May: Exposition of 1930 (Liège) world's fair opens.
 Liège Airport terminal and Pont-barrage de Monsin (bridge) open.
 1937 - Port of Liège established.
 1939
 Albert Canal (Antwerp-Liège) opens.
 Exposition internationale de l'eau (1939) held.
 1940 - German occupation of Belgium during World War II begins.
 1944 - September: German occupation ends.
 1946 - 17 September: City name changed to "Liège" (formerly "Liége").
 1950 - Royal Question (political crisis) occurs.
 1952 - Museum of Fine Arts'  established.
 1957 -  rebuilt.
 1960
 1960–61 Winter General Strike begins.
 Orchestre Philharmonique de Liège formed.
 1962 -  established.
 1967 -  built.
 1976 -  established.
 1977
 Angleur, Chênée, Grivegnée, Jupille, Rocourt, and  become part of Liège.
  (television) established.
 1980
  opens.
  established.
 1981 - Opera Cinema in business.
 1985
 Lawsuit Gravier v City of Liège decided.
  founded.
 1991
 La Zone music venue opens.
 1992 -  museum active.
 1993
  remodelled.
  cinema opens.
 1996 -  cultural space opens.
 1997 - La Meuse newspaper begins publication.
 1999 - Willy Demeyer becomes mayor.
 2000 -  (bridge) and  open.

21st century

 2007
  begins.
 Haute École de la Province de Liège (college) established.
 2008 -  cinema opens.
 2009 - Liège-Guillemins railway station rebuilt.
 2011 - 13 December: 2011 Liège attack occurs on Place Saint-Lambert.
 2012 - 2012 Tour de France cycling race starts from Liège.
 2013 - Population: 195,576.
 2014 - Financial Tower built.

See also
 Liège history
 
 
 List of bishops and prince-bishops of Liège
 List of protected heritage sites in Liège
 Timelines of other municipalities in Belgium: Antwerp, Bruges, Brussels, Ghent, Leuven
 History of urban centers in the Low Countries

References

This article incorporates information from the French Wikipedia.

Bibliography

In English
 
 
 
 
 

 
  + 1881 ed.

In French
  circa 1626-1792
  1738-1744

External links

 Europeana. Items related to Liège, various dates.
 Digital Public Library of America. Items related to Liège, various dates

 
Liege
Liège
Years in Belgium